William Claxton is the name of:

 William Claxton (cricketer) (1857–1937), Australian cricketer
 William Claxton (photographer) (1927–2008), American photographer
 William Gordon Claxton (1899–1967), Canadian World War I ace pilot

See also
William Caxton, printer